The 1956 LPGA Tour was the seventh season since the LPGA Tour officially began in 1950. The season ran from January 14 to October 21. The season consisted of 25 official money events. Marlene Hagge won the most tournaments, eight. She also led the money list with earnings of $20,235.

The season saw the first tournament outside United States, the Havana Open in Cuba. There were five first-time winners in 1956, Kathy Cornelius, Betty Dodd, Mary Lena Faulk, Mickey Wright, and Joyce Ziske. Wright would win 82 LPGA events in her career, second only to Kathy Whitworth's 88.

The tournament results and award winners are listed below.

Tournament results
The following table shows all the official money events for the 1956 season. "Date" is the ending date of the tournament. The numbers in parentheses after the winners' names are the number of wins they had on the tour up to and including that event. Majors are shown in bold.

Awards

References

External links
LPGA Tour official site

LPGA Tour seasons
LPGA Tour